Bosnia and Herzegovina competed at the 2004 Summer Olympics in Athens, Greece, from 13 to 29 August 2004. This was the nation's fourth appearance at the Summer Olympics since the post-Yugoslav era.

Athletics

Bosnian athletes have so far achieved qualifying standards in the following athletics events (up to a maximum of 3 athletes in each event at the 'A' Standard, and 1 at the 'B' Standard). 

Men

Women

Canoeing

Slalom
Men

Judo

Men

Shooting

Men

Swimming

Men

Table tennis

Men

Taekwondo

Men

Tennis

Women

See also
 Bosnia and Herzegovina at the 2005 Mediterranean Games

References

External links
Official Report of the XXVIII Olympiad
Olympic Committee of Bosnia and Herzegovina (OKBIH) 

Nations at the 2004 Summer Olympics
2004
Summer Olympics